Alexander Pavlovich Timofeevskiy (13 November 1933 – 7 January 2022) was a Russian writer, poet, songwriter and screenwriter.

Life and career 
Born in Moscow, at young age Timofeevskiy lived in Stalingrad, being there during the World War II when the German army besieged the city. After the war he graduated from the Gerasimov Institute of Cinematography and was enrolled in the scriptwriting department of the animation film studio Soyuzmultfilm.

In addition to his cinema works, Timofeevskiy wrote dozens of collections of poems, adult and children's books, radio plays and songs, notably the popular children's song "Песенка крокодила Гены" ("Gena the Crocodile's Song"). He died in Moscow on 7 January 2022, at the age of 88.

References

External links
 Alexander Timofeevskiy at Goodreads
 
 

1933 births
2022 deaths
Soviet poets
20th-century Russian poets
21st-century Russian poets
Soviet writers
20th-century Russian writers
21st-century Russian writers
Soviet screenwriters
20th-century Russian screenwriters
Male screenwriters
20th-century Russian male writers
Soviet animators
Russian animators
Writers from Moscow
Burials in Troyekurovskoye Cemetery
Gerasimov Institute of Cinematography alumni